The year 518 BC was a year of the pre-Julian Roman calendar. In the Roman Empire, it was known as year 236  Ab urbe condita. The denomination 518 BC for this year has been used since the early medieval period, when the Anno Domini calendar era became the prevalent method in Europe for naming years.

Events

By topic

Architecture 
 Darius I begins constructing Persepolis, a new capital for the Persian Empire (approximate date).
 Construction begins on the Apadana (audience hall) of Darius and Xerxes, ceremonial complex, at Persepolis, Persia.

Births 
 Pindar, Greek lyric poet (approximate date) (d. 438 BC)
 Xerxes I of Persia (or 519 BC)

Deaths

References